Bani may refer to:

Places

Africa
Bani Department, a department in the Séno Province of Burkina Faso
Bani, Bani, Séno, Burkina Faso 
Bani, Bourzanga, Bam, Burkina Faso
Bani, Gnagna, Burkina Faso
Bani, Gambia
Bani River, a tributary of the Niger River in Mali

Asia
Bani, Chhatoh, a village in Uttar Pradesh, India
Bani, India, an assembly constituency under Kathua, Jammu and Kashmir, India
Bani, Iran, a village in West Azerbaijan Province, Iran
Bani, Mirpur, a town in Pakistan
Bani, Pangasinan, a municipality of the Philippines
Bani, Rahi, a village in Uttar Pradesh, India
Bani, South Khorasan or Boniabad, a village in South Khorasan Province, Iran

Elsewhere
Baní, a city in the Dominican Republic

People
Bani Lozano, Honduran soccer player

Other uses
Banu (Arabic), Beni, Bene or Banī, Arabic for "the sons of" or "children of" which appears before the name of a tribal progenitor
 Bani Isra'il (disambiguation)
 Bani (letter), a letter of the Georgian alphabet
 Bani, a subdivision of the Romanian leu
 Bani, a subdivision of the Moldovan leu
 Bani the Gadite, one of David's Mighty Warriors
 Bani, stylistic school of the Indian classical music genre dhrupad
 Bani Chams, a group of the Cham people who practice Islam

See also
Bani Bid, a village in Kermanshah Province, Iran
 Bene (disambiguation)
 Beni (disambiguation)
Gurbani, a section of Sikh religious texts
Banny (disambiguation)